WITS Academy is an American telenovela-formatted teen sitcom that aired on Nickelodeon from October 5, 2015 to October 30, 2015. The show, a spin-off/sequel to Every Witch Way, was announced on February 25, 2015, and was created by Catharina Ledeboer, produced by Viacom International and Cinemat Inc, executive produced by Tatiana Rodriguez and José V Scheuren. Daniela Nieves, Julia Antonelli and Todd Allen Durkin reprise their roles as Andi, Jessie and Agamemnon. On December 17, 2015, actor Todd Allen Durkin announced that he would be leaving the show, and on March 24, 2016, actress Daniela Nieves stated that the show was cancelled.

Plot
Andi (Emma's best friend) is finally becoming a Guardian, as she is now training and studying at the WITS Academy, the Magic Realm's most esteemed school for witches and wizards-in-training, or WITs. As the best friend and unofficial Guardian to the Chosen One, she will have to work hard to prove that she can live up to expectations as the first and only human Guardian. Andi is also in charge of getting two of the Academy's toughest WITs to graduation day: Jessie, Jax's little sister, and Ben, a young wizard-in-training. Andi meets other Guardians-in-training, like Luke, Lily's cousin, who becomes her love interest, Ruby, who becomes her rival, and Kim, who becomes her best friend. Luke and Andi become a couple, while Ruby is expelled from the Academy. The show left on a cliffhanger but was canceled resulting in there not being a season 2.

Characters

Main
 Andi Cruz (Daniela Nieves) is Emma's best friend who studies and trains to be the first ever human Guardian at the WITS Academy. Andi is outgoing and funny. She has a secret crush on Luke, and they become a couple at the end of the season. Her WITs are Jessie and Ben.
 Jessie Novoa (Julia Antonelli) is Jax's little sister who asks a lot of questions and can be annoying sometimes. She gained her powers in the series finale of Every Witch Way and attends the WITS Academy to learn how to use them. She understands the Hexoren. Jessie is Andi's WIT.
 Ben Davis (Jailen Bates) is a very smart wizard. He is good in theory, but not in practice, so his spells do not always succeed. He does not have much confidence in himself. Sometimes his lack of confidence is very funny. Ben is Andi's other WIT.
 Ruby Webber (Kennedy Lea Slocum): is the main antagonist of the season. She is the first powerless witch of her family, and because of this, she is insecure and a control freak. She hates Andi and is always willing to get her into trouble. Ruby takes the Dyad Tree's magic sap because it gives her powers, but this is reported to Agamemnon, who expels Ruby at the end of the season. Her WITs are Emily and Ethan.
 Emily Prescott (Meg Crosbie) is a young witch who is stubborn and determined to become stronger, due to her weak powers. Emily is Ruby's WIT in the season, although her new Guardian is unknown. She is Ethan's sister
 Ethan Prescott (Timothy Colombos) has a natural talent for magic and likes working in a team. He never questions orders, and does whatever someone tells him to, as he is very loyal. Ethan is Ruby's WIT in the season, although his new Guardian is unknown. He is Emily's brother
 Luke Archer (Ryan Cargill) is Lily's cousin, who belongs to a family of Guardians to Chosen Ones and wants to live up to expectations. Honest and smart, he is very competitive. He has a crush on Andi, and they become a couple at the end of the season. His WITs are Sean and Gracie, whom he cares for very much.
 Gracie Walker (Lidya Jewett) is an exuberant young witch. Gracie is Luke's WIT. She is also a very powerful witch, and because of this is very bossy and stubborn. She is a little too powerful for a young witch. She is the youngest witch at the academy. Gracie looks up to Luke, she also cares for him, like Sean.
 Sean De Soto (Andrew Ortega) is a carefree wizard who wants to have fun and make others smile. Sean is Luke's other WIT. He looks up to Luke, and cares for him, like Gracie.
 Cameron Masters (Tyler Perez): Although easily fooled, he is the best student of the WITS Academy; he is the student prefect and assistant to Agamemnon. He has a crush on Ruby, and obeys her to make her happy.
 Kim Sanders (Jazzy Williams) is a whip-smart inventor who is extremely intelligent, quick-witted and always willing to lend a hand; she is easily the smartest student in the Academy. She becomes Andi's roommate in the second episode and immediately befriends her. Her WITs are Harris and Sienna.
 Agamemnon (Todd Allen Durkin) is the current headmaster of the WITS Academy. He was the leader of the Witches' Council, but he temporarily leaves the Council to focus on his new job, where Desdemona replaces him while he is away. Although interested in his job, he isn't always fond of the WITS or Guardians-in-training, like Andi.

Recurring
Harris (Peter Dager) is  Kim's WIT, alongside Sienna.
Sienna (Erin Whitaker):  Kim's other WIT, alongside Harris.
Amelia Foiler (Andrea Canny) is the Guardian that is a nightmare. She becomes the Academy's new coach in the seventh episode. She doesn't like Andi and tries her best to make her lose. She is revealed to be a fugitive that Leopald Archer was after. During the thirteenth episode, she is captured by Leo and Andi, loses her powers to Agamemnon, and is sent to Limbo.
Leopald Archer (Michael St. Pierre) is Luke's uncle and a warrior from the Bad Realm. He comes to the Academy in the eleventh episode to find a fugitive, who is eventually revealed to be Miss Foiler. In the thirteenth episode, he captures her with Andi's help, then leaves, going back into the bad realm to stop the witches' bottles from happening to other wizards and witches again. He gets on with Andi quite well.
The Hexoren (no voice) is a sentient book of spells, nicknamed "Hex". He can fly, open to a specific page on command, and somewhat communicate. Hex is first of the mother of Emma, but since she is dead Emma has the book. Hex is best friends with Andi, although he belongs to Emma. In the series finale of Every Witch Way, Emma gives Andi the book to take with her to the WITs Academy, and there the friendship is continued.

Episodes

Broadcast
WITS Academy premiered on Nickelodeon in the UK and Ireland on January 5, 2016. It premiered on TeenNick in the U.S. on February 21, 2016. It premiered on Nickelodeon in the Netherlands and Belgium on February 29, 2016.

References

External links

 
 

2015 American television series debuts
2015 American television series endings
2010s American comedy-drama television series
2010s American teen drama television series
2010s American teen sitcoms
2010s Nickelodeon original programming
American fantasy television series
English-language television shows
Television shows set in Miami
Television about magic
Witchcraft in television
American telenovelas
American television spin-offs
American fantasy drama television series
Television series about teenagers
Grachi